Hem till dig is the fourth studio album by Swedish dansband Larz-Kristerz, released on 18 February 2009. For the album, the band was awarded a Grammis award in the "Dansband of the year" category.

Track listing
"Carina" – 3:16
"Purple Rain" – 2.47
"Hem till dig" – 3:33 
"Sweet Child o' Mine" – 2:43
"Regniga natt (Gråtende sky)" – 3:41
"I Love Europe" – 3:01
"Corrine, Corrina" – 3:16
"Visst é dé så" – 3:15
"Hold on Tight" – 2:54
"Eva (strippan från Trosa)" – 2:37
"Yester-Me, Yester-You, Yesterday" – 3:13
"We're Not Gonna Take It" – 3:13
"Papaya Coconut" – 3:37
"Last Date" – 3:18

Charts

Weekly charts

Year-end charts

References 

2009 albums
Larz-Kristerz albums